Jacques Couëlle (1902–1996) was a French architect, whose work was marked by the movement known as architecture-sculpture.

Biography 
Jacques Couëlle is a self-taught architect. Uncategorised, he remains on the margins of major movements in architecture and in particular the Modern Movement. In 1946 he founded "the Research Centre of natural structures". Nicknamed "the architect of billionaires" he has made exceptional homes.

The architecture of Jacques Couëlle, with its sculptural forms of concrete designed and carved, evokes the movement of architecture-sculpture born after the war.

The specificity of Couëlle's architecture is its relationship to nature. His houses fit perfectly into their natural environment because they borrow their forms. They are "home-landscape". This relationship with nature is associated with Antoni Gaudí's organic architecture like the famous Park Güell (1900–1914) in Barcelona, where the paths carved into the slope as caves follow the contours of the land.

An eccentric character, he was a friend of Pablo Picasso and Salvador Dalí. For his artistic merits, he was awarded the Legion of Honour at the French Academy.

He worked together with his son Savin Jacques Couëlle (1929–2020).

Achievements 
 Bastide Saint-François (1925–1936) in the Alpes-Maritimes
 Villa Goupil in Chevreuse (78)
 Village Castellarras-le-Vieux (1955–1963) on the Côte d'Azur
 Hotel Cala di Volpe (1962) in Sardinia
 The House stones at Louveciennes (1994)
 Villa Super, Cannes

References

Bibliography 
 Michel Ragon, "Jacques Couëlle,inCimaise, No. 103, August–October 1971.
 Luigi Gilbert Couëlle Jacques:architectural brackets, Brussels, Peter Mardaga, 1982.
 Luigi Gilbert,Jacques Couëlle: live elsewhere now,the catalog of the exhibition at the Pompidou Center, Paris: Center Georges Pompidou, 1988.
 "Jacques Couëlle,  (AMC), No. 69, March 1996, p. 18-19.
 Frances Arnold, "Jacques Couëlle: houses carved in stone, Architecture Movement Continuity (AMC), No. 77, February 1997, pp. 56–59.
 Jacques-Couelle Castellaras-le-Vieux houses landscape a 52-minute documentary by Patricia Civel and Jerome Sadler

External links 
 Exhibition at the center of the archives of world of work
 Tribute to Wogensky Couëlle 
Video Footage of Couëlle's village Castelleras
Villa Oxygene, Super Cannes, South of France
Domaine Chateauneuf, Valbonne, South of France

20th-century French architects
1902 births
1996 deaths
Architects from Marseille
Members of the Académie des beaux-arts